The 1995–96 Moldovan Cup was the fifth season of the Moldovan annual football cup competition. The competition ended with the final held on 12 May 1996.

Round of 16

|}

Quarter-finals

|}

Semi-finals

|}

Final

References
 

Moldovan Cup seasons
Moldovan Cup
Moldova